The following is a list of the municipalities (comuni) of Basilicata, Italy.

There are 131 municipalities in Basilicata (as of January 2019):

100 in the Province of Potenza
31 in the Province of Matera

List

See also
List of municipalities of Italy

References

 
Geography of Basilicata
Basilicata